The Abraham Lincoln Library and Museum in Harrogate, Tennessee and located on campus of Lincoln Memorial University, exhibits items such as the cane that Lincoln used at Ford's Theatre the night of his assassination, a collection of about 30,000 books, and art exhibits.

References

External links
 Abraham Lincoln Library and Museum

Museums in Claiborne County, Tennessee
Lincoln
Lincoln Memorial University
University museums in Tennessee
American Civil War museums in Tennessee
Presidential museums in Tennessee
Abraham Lincoln
Harrogate, Tennessee